The Fragility Tour was a concert tour in support of industrial rock band Nine Inch Nails' The Fragile album, which took place in late 1999, running until mid-2000, and was broken into two major legs, Fragility v1.0 and Fragility v2.0 respectively. Destinations included Europe, Japan, New Zealand, Australia, and North America.

The tour featured increasingly large production values, including a triptych video display created by contemporary video artist Bill Viola. The images displayed on the triptych focused on storm and water imagery. "I don't want to do the standard 'rock band in a hockey arena' show", said Trent Reznor. "I want to up the par a little bit. I think our stage show has had a lot of thought put into it. It's not like a Korn or Rob Zombie show where they just go into the prop cupboard and pull out as much shit as they can. I hope, when people see our shows, they go, 'Fuck, that was smarter than that Korn tour I saw, but not in a pretentious way – it kicked ass.' On our previous tour the audience was our enemy but, this time around, we're best friends with the audience at the end of shows. Everyone's connected."

Rolling Stone magazine named Fragility v2.0 the best tour of 2000.

The Fragility v2.0 North American leg was filmed and recorded for the live album and double DVD tour documentary And All that Could Have Been, which was released in 2002.

On May 20, 2000, Nine Inch Nails performed their 500th gig (in count) at the Lakewood Amphitheater in Atlanta.

Before several of the later performances, Recoil's 2000 album Liquid was played over the PA system.

On July 9, 2000, the rest of the tour was cancelled due to "band illness". The most notable "illness" was eight days earlier when the band went to London for a concert, and Reznor almost died from a heroin overdose, mistaking the heroin for cocaine, which he was addicted to at the time. He went into and completed rehab in 2001.

Personnel 
Trent Reznor – Lead vocals, guitar, keyboards, bass guitar, Prophet VS synthesizer
Robin Finck – Guitar, E-bow, lap steel synthesizer, backup vocals
Danny Lohner – Bass guitar, guitar, synthesizer, backup vocals
Charlie Clouser – Synthesizer, theremin, vocoder, backup vocals
Jerome Dillon – Drums, samples

Tour legs

Europe

Typical set list 
 "The New Flesh" / "Pinion"
 "Somewhat Damaged"
 "Terrible Lie"
 "Sin"
 "March of the Pigs"
 "Piggy"
 "The Frail"
 "The Wretched"
 "No, You Don't"
 "Gave Up"
 "La Mer"
 "The Great Below"
 "The Way Out Is Through"
 "Wish"
 "Into the Void"
 "Down in It" or "Get Down, Make Love"
 "Head Like a Hole"
 "The Day the World Went Away"
 "Starfuckers, Inc."
 "Closer"
 "Hurt"

Support act 
 Atari Teenage Riot

Dates

Asia

Typical set list 
Same as above.

Support act 
 Skingame

Dates

Oceania

Typical set list 
These shows featured shorter and more aggressive set lists.

Accompanying acts 
 Red Hot Chili Peppers
 Foo Fighters
 Atari Teenage Riot
 Blink-182
 The Chemical Brothers
 A Perfect Circle

Dates

North America

Typical set list 

 "The New Flesh" / "Pinion"
 "Somewhat Damaged"
 "Terrible Lie"
 "Sin"
 "March of the Pigs"
 "Piggy"
 "The Frail"
 "The Wretched"
 "Gave Up"
 "La Mer"
 "The Great Below"
 "The Mark Has Been Made"
 "Wish"
 "Complication"
 "Suck"
 "Closer"
 "Head Like a Hole"
 "The Day the World Went Away"
 "Just Like You Imagined" or "Even Deeper"
 "Starfuckers, Inc."
 "Hurt"

Support act 
 A Perfect Circle

Dates

Europe

Typical set list 
These shows featured shorter and more aggressive set lists.

Dates

Canceled dates

References

External links 
 Official website

1999 concert tours
2000 concert tours
Nine Inch Nails concert tours